Citrinophila tenera, the medium yellow, is a butterfly in the family Lycaenidae. It is found in southern Nigeria, Cameroon, Gabon, the Republic of the Congo, the Democratic Republic of the Congo (Mongala, Uele, Equateur and Sankuru), and Uganda (from the western part of the country to the Bwamba Valley). Their habitat consists of forests.

References

Butterflies described in 1887
Poritiinae
Taxa named by William Forsell Kirby
Butterflies of Africa